King Leopold  may refer to:
Leopold I of Belgium (1790–1865), first king of the Belgians
Leopold II of Belgium (1835–1909), second king of the Belgians and founder and owner of the Congo Free State
Leopold III of Belgium (1901–1983), fourth king of the Belgians
Leopold I, Holy Roman Emperor (1640–1705), also king of Hungary, Bohemia and Croatia
Leopold II, Holy Roman Emperor (1747–1792), also king of Hungary, Bohemia and Croatia